Marko Rudić (born January 17, 1990) is an alpine skier from Bosnia and Herzegovina.  He competed for Bosnia and Herzegovina at the 2010 Winter Olympics.  His best result was a 36th place in the slalom. In the 2014 Winter Olympics he participated in slalom , did not finish and in giant slalom where he finished 49th. He was ranked in top 200 skiers in the World, discipline slalom. Multiple times National winner in both technical disciplines. One of the most decorated and successful skiers in BIH. Currently working as a head Coach of National Ski Team Hong Kong China.

References

External links

1990 births
Living people
Bosnia and Herzegovina male alpine skiers
Olympic alpine skiers of Bosnia and Herzegovina
Alpine skiers at the 2010 Winter Olympics
Alpine skiers at the 2014 Winter Olympics
Serbs of Bosnia and Herzegovina